Vilambit (also called vilambit laya) is an introductory slow tempo, or laya, between 10 and 40 beats per minute, used in the performance of a raga in Hindustani classical music. For major ragas, the vilambit portion generally takes up two-thirds or more of the performance, and is followed by a short drut to conclude the performance. Vocalists use a slower definition of time than instrumentalists (Gottlieb 1977a:41).

See also
 
Khyal
Madhyalaya

Hindustani music terminology
Formal sections in music analysis